Dennis Coke (born 7 October 1993) is a Jamaican badminton player who competed at the 2010 Summer Youth Olympics in Singapore. In 2009, he won the boys' singles and doubles at the All Jamaica Junior Championships. At the BWF International tournament, he was the men's doubles runner-up at the 2015 Carebaco International and mixed doubles runner-up at the 2017 Jamaica International. He also won the bronze medal at the 2016 Pan Am Badminton Championships in the mixed doubles event partnered with Wynter. In 2017, he won the Jamaican National Badminton Championships in the men's singles and doubles event partnered with Anthony McNee. Coke was part of the national team that won the men's team bronze at the 2018 Pan Am Men's Team Championships. In 2018, he competed at the Commonwealth Games in Gold Coast.

Coke graduated from the G.C Foster College, and now works as P.E. teacher at St. Anne's Primary School.

Achievements

Pan Am Championships
Mixed doubles

BWF International Challenge/Series (2 titles, 5 runners-up)
Men's doubles

Mixed doubles

 BWF International Challenge tournament
 BWF International Series tournament
 BWF Future Series tournament

References

External links
 

1993 births
Living people
Sportspeople from Kingston, Jamaica
Jamaican male badminton players
Badminton players at the 2018 Commonwealth Games
Commonwealth Games competitors for Jamaica
Badminton players at the 2010 Summer Youth Olympics